Isidre Codina is a Spanish professional football manager.

Career
In November 1996 he coached the Andorra national football team He was a coach of Sporting Escaldes before.

References

External links

Profile at Soccerpunter.com

Year of birth missing (living people)
Living people
Spanish football managers
Expatriate football managers in Andorra
Andorra national football team managers
Place of birth missing (living people)